is a Japanese comedy manga series by Rekomaru Otoi, serialized online via the online community Pixiv, where it has received over 20 million views. It was later acquired by Ichijinsha and six tankōbon volumes have been published since 2014. A 12-episode anime television series adaptation by Creators in Pack aired between January 7 and March 25, 2016.

Plot 
Habahiro Hige is a man in his late thirties who works at a web-related company. He loves Tabekko marshmallows, and his co-worker, Iori Wakabayashi, often teases him about it, by eating them in front of him and buying all of his favourite type from the convenience store. Though her friends do not see what Iori likes about Habahiro, she is actually aiming to be in a romantic relationship with him, and often tries to get his attention, commenting that she likes his marshmallow-like, chubby frame, with Habahiro often unaware of what she is trying to do.

Characters

A chubby salary man in his late thirties who works in a web related company, he is obsessed with Tabekko marshmallows, to the point that he himself would (at times) hypnotically  get drawn in just by the scent of it, which both Iori and MIO5 used to lure and seduce him in order to win his affection. His name "Hige" literally means facial hair which both describes to either "Beard" or Mustache in Japanese

Hige's co-worker, who is in love with him, she often uses Hige's one-track, marshmallow-obsessed mind to win his affection but often finds her efforts stymied.

She is a bodacious girl whom Hige accidentally saved from a sex pervert who was groping her while in the train where she later fell head over heels for him. She also works in the same company as Hige as an illustrator. Though she competes with  Iori for Hige's affection, she manages to confess her feelings for him, but was turned down because she is already in a relationship with the company president. Despite of being thirty years of age, she still passes herself as twenty five in her social media account. She is also an active cosplayer.     

He is Iori's younger brother who seemly has a bit of a sister complex towards her. Though a lady's man, he is actually a virgin. 

She is Iori's co worker who is very much a foodie.

She is Iori's co-worker who always likes to drink after office hours, she is often pressured by her mother to find a man and get married.

Anime 
The anime adaptation of Ojisan to Marshmallow aired as three-minute-long anime shorts from January 8, 2016, to March 25, 2016.

References

External links
 

Anime series based on manga
Creators in Pack
Comedy anime and manga
Ichijinsha manga
Japanese webcomics
Webcomics in print